Phaio albicincta is a moth of the subfamily Arctiinae. It was described by Schaus in 1896. It is found in Ecuador.

References

Arctiinae
Moths described in 1896